Trag u vremenu is the seventeenth studio album by Serbian singer Dragana Mirković. It was released in 2004.

Track listing
Tamo gde je milo moje (There where is my dear)
Evo dobro sam (Here i am, i'm fine)
Cvet ljubavi (Flower of love)
Fobija (Phobia)
Trag u vremenu (Clue in time)
Rođendan (Birthday)
Učini greh (Make a sin)
Prsten (Ring)
Zašto zoro svanjavaš (Why you dawn rise)
Preživeću (I will survive)
Nekad je valjalo (It used to be good)
Poljubi me (Kiss me)
Slobodna kao vetar (Free like the wind)
Šta bih ja da nema tebe (What would I do if you are not here)

References

2004 albums
Dragana Mirković albums